Henri Debain (3 August 1886 - 15 January 1983) was a French film actor.

He first appeared in Le Petit café in 1919, and appeared in more than 25 films between 1919 and 1956. He directed three films including Mephisto in 1931.

Filmography

As director
 1927 : Chantage
 1928 : Hara-Kiri, achevé par Marie-Louise Iribe
 1930 : Méphisto

As actor
 Châtelaine du Liban, La (1956) .... Un Invité
 Mon curé chez les pauvres (1956)
 Vie privée (1942) .... Le dialoguiste
 Itto (1934) .... Le sergent
 La Maternelle, La (1933) .... Dr. Libois
 Le Béguin de la garnison, Le (1932) .... Le colonel
 La dame de chez Maxim's (1933) .... Etienne
 Gisèle and Partner (1932)
 Léon tout court (1932) .... Le speaker
 Maruche (1932) .... Pinchot
 Étrangère, L' (1931) .... Mister Clarkson
 Aiglon, L' (1931) .... Le sergent
 Monte Cristo (1929) .... Carderousse
 J'ai l'noir ou Le suicide de Dranem (1928)
 Marquitta (1927)
 Michel Strogoff (1926) .... Harry Blount
 Mots croisés (1926)
 Amour et carburateur (1925)
 A Son from America (1924)
 Les Grands (1924)
 Le Costaud des Épinettes (1923)
 Triplepatte (1922)
 La Maison vide (1921)
 Le Secret de Rosette Lambert (1920)
 The Little Cafe (1919)

External links
 

1886 births
1983 deaths
French male film actors
French male silent film actors
20th-century French male actors